Attorney General Fellows may refer to:

Grant Fellows (1865–1929), Attorney General of Michigan
Raymond Fellows (1885–1957), Attorney General of Maine
Thomas Howard Fellows (1822–1878), Attorney General of Victoria

See also
General Fellows (disambiguation)